Kōzō-ji may refer to:

 Kōzō-ji (Kakuda), a Buddhist temple in Kakuda, Miyagi Prefecture, Japan
 Kōzō-ji (Kisarazu, Chiba), a Buddhist temple in Kisarazu, Chiba Prefecture, Japan